Hayashi (林, literally "woods"), is the 19th most common Japanese surname. It shares the same character as the Chinese surname Lin.

Notable people with the surname include:

, Japanese synchronized swimmer
, Japanese footballer
, Japanese scholar and diplomat
, Japanese swimmer
, Japanese singer
Cheryl Hayashi, American biologist
, Japanese businesswoman
, Japanese naval surgeon and Reiki practitioner
, Japanese astrophysicist
, Japanese voice actress
, Japanese footballer
, Japanese sport shooter
, Japanese musician
, Japanese tennis player
, pen name of Kaitarō Hasegawa (1900–1935), Japanese writer
, Japanese writer and poet
, Japanese politician
, Japanese manga artist
, Japanese economist
, Japanese physician
, pen name of Toshio Gotō, Japanese writer
, Japanese neo-Confucian philosopher and writer
, Japanese neo-Confucian philosopher
, Japanese diplomat
, Japanese physician
, Japanese rower
, Japanese samurai
, Japanese classical composer, pianist and conductor
, Japanese historian
, Japanese animator
, better known as Chikage Oogi, Japanese actress and politician 
, Japanese singer, actress and television personality
, Japanese composer
, Japanese sprinter
, Japanese footballer
, Japanese musician
, Japanese government official
, Japanese neo-Confucian scholar, teacher and administrator
, Japanese women's footballer
, member of Aum Shinrikyo
, Japanese singer and composer
, Japanese physicist
Joe Hayashi (1920–1945), United States Army soldier and Medal of Honor recipient
, Japanese politician
, Japanese neo-Confucian scholar
, Japanese film director and screenwriter
Kanna Hayashi, American academic
, Japanese footballer and manager
, better known as Kaz Hayashi, Japanese professional wrestler
, Japanese actor and voice actor
, Japanese diplomat
, Japanese footballer
, Japanese civil servant and general officer
, Japanese kickboxer
, Japanese football player
, Japanese actor
Kim Hayashi (born 1986), American cyclist
Kiralee Hayashi, American stunt woman, actress and gymnast
, Japanese footballer
, Japanese volleyball player
, Japanese politician
, Japanese writer
Marc Hayashi (born 1957), American actor
, Japanese actress and voice actress
, Japanese writer
, Japanese architect
Mary Hayashi, American politician
, Japanese footballer
, Japanese baseball player
, Japanese murderer
Masumi Hayashi (photographer) (1945–2006), American photographer and artist
, Japanese footballer
Moritaka Hayashi, Japanese lawyer
, Japanese politician
, Japanese field hockey player
, Japanese samurai
, Japanese karateka and kickboxer
, Japanese physician, military strategist, scholar, Shinto priest, diviner, and nationalist
, Japanese television personality
Patrick Hayashi, the defendant in the property law case Popov v. Hayashi
, Japanese neo-Confucian philosopher and writer
Ryan Hayashi (born 1973), Canadian magician
, Japanese footballer
, Japanese neo-Confucian scholar, teacher and administrator
, Japanese footballer
, Japanese women's basketball player
, Japanese footballer
Scott B. Hayashi (born 1953), American Episcopal bishop
, Japanese general, politician and Prime Minister of Japan
, Japanese photographer
, Japanese military scholar
Hayashi Shiryu, Japanese swordsman
Shizuya Hayashi, Japanese-American World War II soldier
, Japanese footballer
, Japanese architect
, Japanese footballer
, Japanese actor
, Japanese table tennis player
, Japanese photographer
, Japanese art dealer
, Japanese basketball coach
, Japanese diplomat
, Japanese daimyō
, Japanese equestrian
, Japanese photographer
, Japanese footballer
, Japanese footballer
, Japanese footballer
Teru Hayashi (1914–2003), Japanese-American biologist
, Japanese composer
, Japanese-Estonian architect
, Japanese footballer
Toshiko Hayashi (1940-2022), Japanese communist politician
, Japanese rugby union player
, Japanese mathematician
, Japanese actor
, Japanese educator and social worker
, one of the perpetrators of the 1995 Sarin gas attack on the Tokyo subway
, Japanese neuroscientist
, Japanese samurai
, Japanese footballer
, Japanese actor
, Japanese lawyer
, Japanese general
, better known as Yoshiki, Japanese musician, songwriter, composer and record producer
, Japanese politician
Yoshimi Hayashi (1923–2006), American lawyer
, Japanese golfer
, Japanese politician
, Japanese voice actor and singer
, Japanese director
, Japanese archer
, Japanese composer and arranger
, Japanese volleyball player
, Japanese AV idol and actress
, Japanese footballer
, Japanese politician

See also
林 (disambiguation)

References

Japanese-language surnames